Pyrus hopeiensis is a species of wild pear in the family Rosaceae, native to north-central China. It is a naturally occurring hybrid of other Chinese Pyrus species, but is it unclear which ones are its parents. Its fruits are small and bitter, so it is not valued or conserved by locals.

References

hopeiensis
Endemic flora of China
Flora of North-Central China
Plants described in 1963